Olavi Rokka (9 August 1925 – 21 December 2011) was a Finnish modern pentathlete. He won a bronze medal in the team modern pentathlete event at the 1952 Summer Olympics.

References

1925 births
2011 deaths
Finnish male modern pentathletes
Olympic modern pentathletes of Finland
Modern pentathletes at the 1952 Summer Olympics
Olympic bronze medalists for Finland
Olympic medalists in modern pentathlon
Sportspeople from Vyborg
Medalists at the 1952 Summer Olympics